Grouvellina is a genus of beetles in the family Carabidae, containing the following species:

 Grouvellina canaliculata (Laporte, 1836)
 Grouvellina cinerea R.T. Bell & J.R. Bell, 1979
 Grouvellina cooperi R.T. Bell & J.R. Bell, 1979
 Grouvellina cuneata R.T. Bell & J.R. Bell, 1979
 Grouvellina dentipes R.T. Bell & J.R. Bell, 1979
 Grouvellina descarpentriesi R.T. Bell & J.R. Bell, 1979
 Grouvellina divergens R.T. Bell & J.R. Bell, 1979
 Grouvellina edentata R.T. Bell & J.R. Bell, 1979
 Grouvellina gigas R.T. Bell & J.R. Bell, 1979
 Grouvellina grouvellei (Fairmaire, 1895)
 Grouvellina hexadon R.T. Bell & J.R. Bell, 1985
 Grouvellina hova R.T. Bell & J.R. Bell, 1979
 Grouvellina montana R.T. Bell & J.R. Bell, 1979
 Grouvellina planifrons (Fairmaire, 1893)
 Grouvellina radama R.T. Bell & J.R. Bell, 1979
 Grouvellina ranavalona R.T. Bell & J.R. Bell, 1979
 Grouvellina tubericeps (Fairmaire, 1868)

References

Rhysodinae
Carabidae genera